Irish Pine was a  cargo ship which was built in 1919 for the United States Maritime Commission (USMC) and named West Hematite. She was chartered in 1941 by Irish Shipping Ltd and renamed Irish Pine.

Description
The ship was built to Design 1013 by J. F. Duthie & Company, Seattle, Washington, was launched on 26 April 1919 and completed in June of that year. It was built by the Llewellyn Iron Works, Los Angeles. She could make .

History
West Hematite was built for the USMC. She was initially chartered to Cosmo Shipping Co and was used on the Bordeaux – Rotterdam – Le Havre – New York route. On 16 February 1923, she ran aground in the Weser. The American cargo ship  went to her assistance and also ran aground. By 1933, she had passed to the United States Shipping Board (USSB). She was later withdrawn from service and placed in the reserve fleet.

On 26 September 1941, West Hematite was chartered from the USSB by Irish Shipping Ltd and renamed Irish Pine.  was also chartered from the USSB. Irish Pine rescued 15 of the 50 survivors and landed them at Kilrush.

At 00:15 on 16 November 1942, Irish Pine was hit by a single torpedo from U-608. Although the 33 crew started to take to the lifeboats, the ship sank at 00:17, costing everyone on board their life. Ireland had not declared war on Germany, and therefore Irish Pine was a neutral vessel.

Official number and code letters
Official Numbers were a forerunner to IMO Numbers. West Hematite had the United States Official Number 218111. Irish Pine had the United Kingdom Official Number 159843.

West Hematite used the Code Letters LRGF from 1930 and KLCS from 1934. Irish Pine used the Code Letters EINQ.

References

External links
Irishships - Irish Shipping Ltd
List of crew lost on Irish Pine 

1919 ships
Ships built by J. F. Duthie & Company
Steamships of the United States
Merchant ships of the United States
Steamships of the Republic of Ireland
World War II merchant ships of the Republic of Ireland
Independent Ireland in World War II
Maritime history of Ireland
Maritime incidents in 1923
Maritime incidents in November 1942
Ships sunk by German submarines in World War II
World War II shipwrecks in the Atlantic Ocean
Ships lost with all hands
Design 1013 ships